The 2022 Shiga gubernatorial election was held on 10 July 2022 to elect the next governor of , a prefecture of Japan located in the Kansai region of Honshu island.

Candidates 

Taizo Mikazuki, incumbent since 2014, 51, ex-lawmaker of the DPJ, endorsed by DPFP, CDP, LDP, Komeito and SDP.
Kiyotsugu Konishi, endorsed by JCP.

Results

References 

2022 elections in Japan
Shiga gubernational elections
Politics of Shiga Prefecture
July 2022 events in Japan